The Foreigner is a 2017 action thriller film directed by Martin Campbell and written by David Marconi, based on the 1992 novel The Chinaman by Stephen Leather. A British-Chinese-American co-production, it stars Jackie Chan, Pierce Brosnan, Michael McElhatton, Liu Tao, Charlie Murphy, Orla Brady, and Katie Leung. The film follows a London-based Chinese Nùng man who seeks vengeance for the death of his youngest daughter.

The Foreigner was released in China on 30 September 2017, in the United States on 13 October 2017, distributed by STXfilms, and in the United Kingdom in December 2017 on Netflix. The film grossed $145 million at the worldwide box office and was one of 2018's top ten most-watched Netflix original films in the UK. It received generally favourable reviews from critics, with praise for the action sequences, score and against type performances of Chan and Brosnan, but criticism towards the formulaic action thriller plot.

Plot
Ngoc Minh Quan, a widowed former Vietnam War special operations forces soldier, runs a Chinese restaurant in London with his business partner Lam. When his teenage daughter Fan is killed in a terrorist bombing, Quan seeks revenge. The British police discover an IRA codeword was used in the bombing and an Irish republican group calling itself the "Authentic IRA" claims responsibility. Quan takes to visiting Scotland Yard daily, asking for names of the bombers, but is told by Commander Bromley that his visits are diverting resources away from the investigation. Bromley advises Quan to be patient and warns him against going after the IRA. Undeterred, Quan takes matters into his own hands and turns his attention to the Northern Ireland deputy First Minister and Sinn Féin politician Liam Hennessy, a former Provisional IRA leader who has since claimed to have renounced violence. Quan purchases items to make homemade weapons and travels to Belfast, leaving the restaurant under Lam's control.

Quan seeks out Hennessy at his office but Hennessy claims to have no knowledge of the perpetrators before ejecting him from the premises. Quan does not believe him, and sets off a homemade bomb in Hennessy's building before leaving a fake explosive on Hennessy's car as warnings. Hennessy tells his men to find Quan and stop him. Under pressure from the British government and hoping to shore up his position ahead of Northern Irish Assembly elections, Hennessy tries to identify the culprits with help from his former IRA comrades. He orders that known IRA weapons dumps be searched for missing Semtex. Hennessy's bodyguards, led by his right-hand-man, Jim Kavanagh, find Quan at his guesthouse but he fights them off and escapes. Quan later observes Hennessy with his mistress Maggie and photographs them kissing in a restaurant.

Quan then brings the fight to Hennessy, hiding in the trees outside his farmhouse and attacking it with more explosives. As Hennessy's henchmen attempt to track him, Quan disables them with traps and attempts to interrogate one, but is shot in the shoulder by Kavanagh and flees. Tending to his wounds, Quan recalls his escape from Vietnam in which his first two daughters were kidnapped, raped, and killed by Thai pirates. Hennessy also investigates Quan's background and discovers he was a former guerrilla fighter who was recruited by the CIA in Vietnam. After Quan ambushes Hennessy in his house, Hennessy contacts his nephew Sean Morrison, a former Royal Irish Regiment soldier, from New York City in the hope that Morrison's tracking skills can be used to stop Quan. Hennessey first sends Sean to London to negotiate with Bromley and strike a deal in which Hennessy will tell each IRA cell to change their codewords, thus allowing the two of them to pinpoint the bombers after their next attack. Bromley agrees, on the condition that the police will take them down, not him and his uncle.

Hugh McGrath, one of Hennessy's old IRA commanders during The Troubles, arrives and asks Hennessy why his weapon dumps are being searched. Hennessy tells Hugh that the semtex used in the bombing came from one of his dumps. McGrath denies knowing anything and claims that everything was in order. McGrath then tells Hennessy that he believes the attacks should continue and tries to persuade Hennessy to think the same. Hennessy reveals that he secretly ordered the bombings, but ordered that only financial institutions should be targeted and that civilians should be spared. Angry, McGrath accuses Hennessy of caring more about his position within the British government than the IRA's cause. McGrath then leaves, but not before Hennessy threatens him saying if the bombers are not caught, he will go after McGrath next.

A second bombing occurs on a double-decker bus and no codeword is given, prompting distrust between Bromley and Hennessy. British cabinet minister Katherine Davies tells Hennessy that Royal pardons for several of his IRA ex-comrades (which he previously sought) will be considered only if he immediately hands over the bombers. If he fails to, British soldiers will re-occupy the streets of Northern Ireland within two days. Hennessy soon learns from one of his men that Sean unintentionally leaked information to Mary whilst having an adulterous dalliance with her. Meanwhile, Bromley finds out that Hugh McGrath is the ringleader of the Authentic IRA and notifies Hennessy of the discovery. Hennessy tortures McGrath (by shooting him in both knees) into giving him the identities of the bombers with Maggie among them, whose real name is Sara Mackay. The affair was planned to tie Liam to the bombers in case he chose not to support further violence. Hennessy also discovers that the true mastermind of the attacks is his own wife, Mary. She bitterly resents the British due to her brother Patrick dying at the hands of the Ulster Volunteer Force and hates her husband for allowing his killers to be imprisoned instead of ordering their murders. In retaliation for his betrayal and for involving his wife and mistress, Hennessy executes McGrath with a bullet to the head. He then phones Morrison and shares the info, anticipating that his nephew might not succeed in defeating Quan.

Sean finds Quan's hiding place in the forest. After a knife fight, Quan captures Sean, who names the terrorists and their location in London before Quan lets him go. When Sean returns to the farmhouse, Hennessy admonishes his nephew for his actions. He tells him to bury McGrath in the pig pen, informs Morrison of last task that he has for him, and that upon its completion Morrison must return to New York.

As the police and MI5 prepare to raid the bombers' London hideout, Quan enters the flat disguised as a handyman and kills everyone but Maggie, leaving her severely wounded. Quan leaves just before the police storm the apartment. They then torture Maggie into disclosing the location of their next bomb, which has been planted in a laptop belonging to a reporter whom Maggie seduced, and is to be detonated on a plane carrying British dignitaries to a conference in Rome. With only seconds to spare, British police throw the laptop into an empty jet bridge, where it detonates without casualties. With the threat resolved, Maggie is executed to prevent any "loose ends." Hennessy gets a call from Davies, who was scheduled to be on the targeted flight. She tells him that she has learned of his involvement with the bombers, but having helped prevent the last attack he can retain his position as deputy First Minister, albeit under her control. Davies also informs Hennessy that pardons for five IRA fugitives, including his cousin, have been issued and that he must fly back to London the next day for a debriefing. Sean visits Mary and shoots her dead with a silenced pistol, eliminating the entire Authentic IRA cell and removing all links to Hennessy.

Hennessy goes to his hotel and is confronted by Quan with the picture of him kissing Maggie on his phone. He forces Hennessy to send the picture to the internet, publicly exposing his association with the Authentic IRA and effectively killing his political career. After telling Hennessy that whole world will know he is a terrorist, Quan returns to his restaurant and reunites with Lam.

Scotland Yard realizes Quan's role in the events and has him put under surveillance; on the basis that he thinks that they "owe [Quan] something", Bromley decides not to take any further action against Quan and keeps him as "observe and report only."

Cast

Production
On 5 June 2015 it was announced that Jackie Chan would star in the action thriller film The Foreigner, for STX Entertainment, and based on Stephen Leather's novel The Chinaman. Nick Cassavetes initially signed to direct the film, which was adapted from Leather's novel by David Marconi, while Wayne Marc Godfrey was one of the producers. The film is partially set in Walworth, London. On 15 July 2015, Deadline reported that Martin Campbell was instead in talks to direct the film, while Relativity Media would finance. Campbell was paid $2 million for the film. Pierce Brosnan joined the cast alongside Chan in November. Brosnan previously starred in the 1995 film GoldenEye directed by Campbell. Co-stars Liu Tao and Chan attended the Shanghai Film Festival on 11 June 2016 to promote the film.

Principal photography commenced in January 2016. The filming in London of a scene involving the explosion of a bus on Lambeth Bridge caused some alarm, as people were not aware that it was a stunt. Scenes were shot at the Walters & Cohen designed Regent High School in Camden and on Churton Street in Pimlico on 18 February 2016.

Cliff Martinez composed the score.

Release
The Fyzz Facility produced, and is distributing, The Foreigner, in association with Sparkle Roll Media and Huayi Brothers, while STXfilms distributes it theatrically across the United States of America.

It was released on 30 September 2017 in China and 13 October 2017 in the United States. In the Philippines, the film was distributed by Viva International Pictures on 18 October 2017.

Box office
The Foreigner grossed $34.4 million in the United States and Canada, and $111 million in other countries for a worldwide total of $145.4 million, against a production budget of $35 million.

In the United States and Canada, the film opened alongside Happy Death Day, Marshall and Professor Marston and the Wonder Women, and was expected to gross $10–15 million from 2,555 theaters in its opening weekend. It made $4.8 million on its first day, including $855,000 from Thursday night previews. It went on to open to $15.5 million, finishing third at the box office behind Happy Death Day and Blade Runner 2049.

Home media 
In the United Kingdom, it was released in December 2017 on Netflix. It became one of the UK's top ten most-watched Netflix original films of 2018, with a 0.37% share of the total Netflix content consumed in the UK that year.

A DVD and Blu-ray released in the United States on 9 January 2018 and 23 January in Canada and the rest of the world.

Critical response
On Rotten Tomatoes, the film has an all-critics approval rating of 66% based on 127 reviews, with an average rating of 6.0/10. The film has an audience approval rating of 72% based on 10,000 plus ratings. The site's critical consensus reads, "The Foreigner adheres strictly to action thriller formula, but benefits from committed—and out of character—performances from its talented veteran stars." On Metacritic, the film has a weighted average score of 55 out of 100, based on 23 critics, indicating "mixed or average reviews". Audiences polled by CinemaScore gave the film an average grade of "A−" on an A+ to F scale, while PostTrak reported 78% of filmgoers gave it positive score.

The film was viewed positively by most critics. Peter Travers of Rolling Stone gave the film three out of four stars and praised Chan's performance, saying: "It's the most dramatic role Chan has ever tackled, and he plays it with coiled intensity and raw emotional power." Clarence Tsui of The Hollywood Reporter also praised Chan, writing, "It's good to see Chan swapping his happy-go-lucky persona for two hours for some gravitas as a tragic rogue with a marked past." John Berra of Screen Daily praised the action sequences, Cliff Martinez's score and the direction, stating "Campbell's unfussy style works well with Chan’s choreography. The star’s willingness to look his 63 years makes the falls look like they really hurt and creates a sense of jeopardy when Quan finds himself outnumbered." He also observed that the film "never commits the cinematic sin of suggesting that terrorism is a threat than can be readily dispatched with a few one-liners." Ignatiy Vishnevetsky for The A.V. Club described the film as "good, lean cut of meat—in other words, a typical Martin Campbell movie, expeditious and cold-blooded in its cross-cut, cloak-and-dagger plotting and violence." The Chicago Reader also commended the performances of Chan and Brosnan and called The Foreigner a "twisty, bracing political thriller, giving Chan room to display his dramatic ability." The Times of India gave a positive review of Campbell's direction and the film's suspense, stating that it can keep viewers "engrossed."

In more mixed reviews, Peter Debruge of Variety wrote "The Foreigner amounts to an above-average but largely by-the-numbers action movie in which Chan does battle with generic thugs and shadowy political forces." Glenn Kenny writing in The New York Times stated Chan "doesn’t deliver the action pizazz here that he used to," criticised the plot as "convoluted" and felt that the use of the IRA as antagonists was outdated in relation to current events.

Potential sequel
In January 2016, The New Yorker quoted Jackie Chan in-conversation with then-STX chairman Adam Fogelson as having suggested that a female character in The Foreigner who had been killed off in the script had been kept alive so-as to “save her for No. 2[.] Now the I.R.A. goes after her—and that’s the story.” On said meeting with Chan and the concept of The Foreigner No. 2 sequel film discussed, Fogelson then remarked, “A few years ago, thinking about the sequel that way would be characterized as a lazy, greedy bastardization of the creative process. If you said that now, you’d be telling the entire world that they’re wrong. Sequels have become a duty—a form of storytelling that, thanks to great television, audiences have grown accustomed to. You can aspire to create six two-hour movies that develop your concept across multiple resolutions—which makes movies easier to sell, and creates a more predictable business model. Half the films we’ll say yes to will have sequelable potential.”

References

External links
 
 The Foreigner | STX
 
 

2017 films
2017 action thriller films
British action thriller films
Chinese action thriller films
British films about revenge
American action thriller films
English-language Chinese films
American films about revenge
Films about terrorism in Europe
Films about the Irish Republican Army
Films based on British novels
Films based on thriller novels
Films directed by Martin Campbell
Films scored by Cliff Martinez
Films set in Belfast
Films set in London
Films shot in London
Huayi Brothers films
2010s political thriller films
Sparkle Roll Media films
STX Entertainment films
Wanda Pictures films
Films set in Northern Ireland
Films about The Troubles (Northern Ireland)
Films about father–daughter relationships
2010s English-language films
2010s American films
2010s British films